Prostitution in Japan has existed throughout the country's history. While the Prostitution Prevention Law of 1956 states that "No person may either do prostitution or become the customer of it", loopholes, liberal interpretations and a loose enforcement of the law have allowed the Japanese sex industry to prosper and earn an estimated 2.3 trillion yen ($24 billion) per year.

Since Japanese law defines prostitution as "intercourse with an unspecified person in exchange for payment", most  services offer specifically non-coital services, such as conversation, dancing or bathing, sometimes accompanied by sexual acts that legally are not defined as "intercourse", in order to remain legal.

History 
From the 15th century, Chinese, Koreans, and other East Asian visitors frequented brothels in Japan.

This practice later continued among visitors from "the Western regions", mainly European traders who often came with their South Asian lascar crew (in addition to African crew members in some cases). These mistaken assumptions were due to the Indian state of Goa being a central base for the Portuguese East India Company at the time, and due to a significant portion of the crew on Portuguese ships being Indian Christians.

Hundreds of Japanese people, especially women, were sold as slaves. Portuguese visitors and their South Asian and African crew members (or slaves) often engaged in slavery in Japan. They bought or captured young Japanese women and girls, who were either used as sexual slaves on their ships or taken to Macau and other Portuguese colonies in Southeast Asia, the Americas, and India, where there was a community of Japanese slaves and traders in Goa by the early 17th century. Anti-Portuguese propaganda and exaggerations were actively promoted by the Japanese, particularly with regards to the Portuguese purchases of Japanese women for sexual purposes.

In 1505, syphilis started to appear in Japan, likely because of Japanese prostitutes having sex with Chinese sailors. In Sakai and Hakata ports, Japanese brothels had already been patronized by Chinese visitors far before Europeans came to Japan. When the Europeans came to Japan, they too patronized Japanese prostitutes. Traders of the various European East India Companies, including those of the Dutch and British, engaged the services of prostitutes while visiting or staying in Japan.

Edo era 

The most famous of these were Yoshiwara in Edo (present-day Tokyo), Shinmachi in Osaka, and Shimabara in Kyoto.

Pleasure quarters were walled and guarded for taxation and access control.

Japanese women engaged in sexual relations with foreign men like Chinese and Europeans at port cities like Hirado. In 1609, a post was set up in Hirado by the Dutch East India Company. Unmarried women could be rented from their parents for a few months or weeks by foreign sailors who were stranded there during typhoons. After several summers, the women would retire from prostitution and then marry after getting a trousseau from the money they earned from sex work. In some cases, Japanese women would marry the foreign traders or enter into a long-term relationship as their permanent concubine.

How Japanese women and foreign men engaged in sexual relations varied by situation and could lead to some strange cases. Once, two Japanese women bore daughters at the same time to Cornelis van Nijenroode, a Dutch merchant who was made the trading posts' chief factor in 1623. Zheng Chenggong (Coxinga), a Chinese Ming loyalist that would eventually become Prince of Yanping, was born from relations between a Japanese woman and the Chinese Hokkien trader Zheng Zhilong. One of Tokugawa Ieyasu's key advisors, Englishman William Adams, was married to the daughter of the Honshu headman and also had a Japanese concubine while living in Hirado.

Chinese men visiting Edo period Japan also patronized Japanese sex workers in brothels designated for them. The price of the girls offered to Japanese and Chinese customers was significantly lower than the price of the girls designated for Dutch customers. This disparity was likely not noticed by the Dutch, as their traders were confined to the designated post of Dejima where  prostitutes were sent. Many prostitutes were sent to Dejima after they serviced the Chinese at Maruyama; they were paid for by the Commissioners for Victualing.

Initially, Chinese men were much less restricted than the Dutch were at Dejima. They could live all over Nagasaki and, from 1635, could have sex with both the  Japanese prostitutes and ordinary Japanese women, unlike Dutch men who were limited to prostitutes. Eventually, however, the rules that applied to Dutch were applied to the Chinese. They were put into Chinese settlements like Jūzenji-mura and Tōjun-yashiki in 1688 and were allowed only to have sex with the  prostitutes sent to them. Some Chinese men developed long term romances with the Japanese girls: Chinese Suzhou (Su-chou) merchant Chen Renxie (Ch'ên Jên-hsieh) and Japanese Azuyama woman Renzan committed suicide together in 1789 as a result of a lover's pact; the Chinese He Minde (Ho Min-tê) pledged eternal love in Yoriai-machi with the Chikugoya Japanese girl Towa, who later killed herself to join him in death when he was executed for forgery in 1690.

The Chinese men were very generous with their gifts to Japanese women and were in turn praised for it. This long-term patronage was possible because the Japanese prostitutes would violate laws stating that they were only permitted each to spend one night in the Chinese settlement. After reporting to the guards by the settlement gates in the morning that they were leaving, the women would then retrace their steps and return inside.

Under the laws and regulations of the Shōtoku era (1711–1716), children of Japanese women and foreign (either Dutch or Chinese) men born in Maruyama were considered mixed race. These children had to stay in Japan and could not be taken back to their father's country, but their fathers could fund their education. This happened quite frequently. For example, Nanking Chinese captain Huang Zheqing (Huang Chê-ch'ing) fathered a son named Kimpachi with Yakumo, a Japanese woman from Iwataya. When he came back to Nagasaki in 1723 at the age of 71, he requested a permit from the Chief Administrator's Office of Nagasaki to trade goods to create a fund for his son to live on for all his life.

Aspects of 17th- and 18th-century Chinese culture were introduced to Japan because of these relations. Chinese dishes and other delicacies became mainstream favourites because of Chinese men teaching Japanese prostitutes how to make them. In the Genroku era (1688-1704), a Chinese man instructed the Japanese prostitute Ume how to make , a soft sweet made from sugar and rice flour that is shaped like a plum blossom. Her name also meant plum blossom.

The Japanese prostitutes of Maruyama who served the Chinese men in Nagasaki were taught many songs and dances of Chinese origin. The  were used to play Kyūrenhwan songs. The Kankan-odori dance accompanied one of these songs which spread in Edo and Kyoto as it gained fame. Exhibitions of the original Chinese style dance were also arranged by Takahashi Kageyasu (1785–1829), the court astronomer of the Shogunate, to be performed in Edo. He sent for the Nagasaki officials managing the Chinese settlements and requested that the geisha come to perform.

Prewar modern era
The opening of Japan and the subsequent flood of Western influences into Japan brought about a series of changes in the Meiji period. Japanese novelists, notably Higuchi Ichiyō, started to draw attention to the confinement and squalid existence of the lower-class prostitutes in the red-light districts. In 1872, the María Luz Incident led Government of Meiji Japan to enact new legislation, emancipating  outcasts, prostitutes and other forms of bonded labor in Japan. The emancipating law for prostitution was named . In 1900, the Japanese Government promulgated Ordinance No. 44, restricting the labor conditions of prostitution. The restriction neither reduced the total number of prostitution nor granted more liberty to women. Instead, prostitution thrived under the Meiji government. The name  was to describe Japan during the Meiji Period. Due to the development of the modern transportation system, the demand and the supply of prostitution increased, and the population of the female population drastically increased. The government, therefore, with the legislation, could legally collect taxation from prostitution. Rather than improving human rights or liberty, the legislation intended to facilitate government revenue. The prostitution industry contributed a large part of government revenue from the late Tokugawa period to the Meiji period.

In 1908, the Ministry of Home Affairs' Ordinance No. 16 penalized unregulated prostitution.

was the name given to Japanese girls and women in the late 19th and early 20th centuries who were trafficked from poverty stricken agricultural prefectures in Japan to destinations in East Asia, Southeast Asia, Siberia (Russian Far East), Manchuria, and India to serve as prostitutes and sexually serviced men from a variety of races, including Chinese, Europeans, native Southeast Asians, and others.

Postwar era 

Immediately after World War II, the Recreation and Amusement Association was formed by Naruhiko Higashikuni's government to organize brothels to serve the Allied armed forces occupying Japan. On 19 August 1945, the Home Ministry ordered local government offices to establish a prostitution service for Allied soldiers to preserve the "purity" of the Japanese race. This prostitution system was similar to the comfort system, because the Japanese police force was responsible for mobilizing the women to serve in these stations similarly to the way that Japanese Military during the Pacific War mobilized women. The police forces mobilized both licensed and unlicensed prostitutes to serve in these camps. The official declaration stated that "Through the sacrifice of thousands of 'Okichis' of the Shōwa era, we shall construct a dike to hold back the mad frenzy of the occupation troops and cultivate and preserve the purity of our race long into the future." Such clubs were soon established by cabinet councilor Yoshio Kodama and Ryoichi Sasakawa.

SCAP abolished the licensed prostitution system (including the RAA) in 1946, which led to the so-called  system, under which licensed nightlife establishments offered sexual services under the guise of being an ordinary club or cafe. Local police authorities traditionally regulated the location of such establishments by drawing red lines on a map. In other areas, so-called "blue line" establishments offered sexual services under the guise of being restaurants, bars or other less strictly-regulated establishments. In Tokyo, the best-known "red line" districts were Yoshiwara and Shinjuku 2-chome, while the best-known "blue line" district was Kabuki-cho.

In 1947, Imperial Ordinance No. 9 punished persons for enticing women to act as prostitutes, but prostitution itself remained legal. Several bills were introduced in the Diet to add further legal penalties for soliciting prostitutes but were not passed due to disputes over the appropriate extent of punishment.

On 24 May 1956, the Diet of Japan passed the Anti-Prostitution Law, which came into force in April 1958. The Anti-Prostitution Law criminalized the act of committing sexual intercourse in exchange for actual or promised compensation. This eliminated the "red line" and "blue line" systems and allowed a number of paid sexual services to continue under "sexual entertainment" regulations, such as "soaplands" and "fashion health" parlors.

In 2013, Toru Hashimoto, co-leads the Japan Restoration Party proposed "There are places where people can legally release their sexual energy in Japan", and "Unless they make use of these facilities, it will be difficult to control the sexual energies of the wild Marines." The U.S. Department of State later criticized Hashimoto's remarks.

Religious connotations

Shinto
The Shinto faith does not regard sex as a taboo. While  primarily provided religious services, they were also widely associated with prostitution. However, no religious reasons for  prostitution are known, and hence the act might be unrelated to sacred prostitution.

Buddhism
Buddhist teachings regarding sex are quite reserved: "It is true to say that Buddhism, in keeping with the principle of the Middle Way, would advocate neither extreme puritanism nor extreme permissiveness." Buddhism has rules and protocols for those that are to live the Buddhist principles in the monasteries and the secular part of the [Shanga]. For the Buddhist monks or nuns, chastity is mandatory since they live on the premise of getting rid of any feelings of attachment. Their way of living is regulated by very strict rules concerning behavior and this includes sex.

As for the secular Buddhists, there are no specific rules to be followed about sex; although any kind of abuse is regarded as "misconduct".

Current status

Legal status
Instead, the following are prohibited on pain of penalty: soliciting for purposes of prostitution, procuring a person for prostitution, coercing a person into prostitution, receiving compensation from the prostitution of others, inducing a person to be a prostitute by paying an "advance", concluding a contract for making a person a prostitute, furnishing a place for prostitution, engaging in the business of making a person a prostitute, and the furnishing of funds for prostitution.

The definition of prostitution is strictly limited to coitus with an "unspecified person". This means sale of numerous acts such as oral sex, anal sex, mammary intercourse and other non-coital sex acts are legal. Paid sex between "specified persons" (acquaintances) is not prohibited. Soaplands exploit this by providing a massage, during which the prostitute and client become "acquainted", as a preliminary to sexual services.

The , also known as the "Law to Regulate Adult Entertainment Businesses", amended in 1985, 1999 and 2005, regulates these businesses.

Types 

The sex industry in Japan uses a variety of names. Soaplands are bath houses where customers are soaped up and serviced by staff. Fashion health shops and pink salons are notionally massage or esthetic treatment parlors; image clubs are themed versions of the same. Call girls operate via delivery health services. Freelancers can get in contact with potential customers via deai sites (Internet dating sites).

Tokyo is the business and trade center of Japan, and therefore also a thriving market for sex work of all varieties. Kabukicho, an entertainment and red-light district in Shinjuku, Tokyo, measures only 0.34 km2, and has approximately 3,500 sex parlors, strip theaters, peep shows, "soaplands", 'lovers' banks, porno shops, sex telephone clubs, karaoke bars and clubs, etc.

It was reported in 2003 that as many as 150,000 non-Japanese women were then involved in prostitution in Japan. According to National Police Agency records, out of 50 non-Japanese people arrested for prostitution offences in 2013, 31 (62%) were mainland Chinese, 13 (26%) were Koreans and 4 (8%) were Thai.

According to National Police Agency records, out of 224 non-Japanese people arrested for prostitution offences in 2018, 160 (71%) were mainland Chinese, 19 (8%) were Thai.

Many businesses related to prostitution voluntarily (i.e., despite there being no regulation requiring it) ban entry to foreigners, including tourists, people who cannot speak Japanese, and even people who do not have Asian traits. However in recent years, several businesses have been set up to specifically cater to the foreigner market.

Terms

Sex trafficking 

Japan is a destination, source, and transit country for men, women and children subjected to sex trafficking. Men, women, and children from Northeast Asia, Southeast Asia, South Asia, Russia, East Europe, South America, and Africa travel to Japan for employment or fraudulent marriage and are subjected to sex trafficking. Traffickers use fraudulent marriages between foreign women and Japanese men to facilitate the entry of women into Japan for forced prostitution in bars, clubs, brothels, and massage parlors. Traffickers keep victims in forced prostitution using debt bondage, threats of violence or deportation, blackmail, passport retention, and other psychologically coercive methods. Brothel operators sometimes arbitrarily impose "fines" on victims for alleged misbehavior as a tactic to extend their indebtedness. Trafficking victims reportedly transit Japan before being exploited in onward destinations, including East Asia and North America.

Japanese citizens, particularly runaway teenage girls, are also subjected to sex trafficking. , or "compensated dating", and variants of the JK business continue to facilitate the sex trafficking of Japanese children. Highly organized prostitution networks target vulnerable Japanese women and girls—often living in poverty or with cognitive disabilities—in public spaces such as subways, popular youth hangouts, schools, and online, and subject them to sex trafficking. Private Japanese immigration brokers help Japanese-Filipino children and their Filipina mothers move to Japan and acquire citizenship for a significant fee, which the mothers often incur large debts to pay; upon arrival, some of these women and their children are subjected to sex trafficking to pay off the debts.

, the United States Department of State Office to Monitor and Combat Trafficking in Persons ranks Japan as a 'Tier 2' country.

See also
 
 Comfort women serving in brothels of the Japanese military in World War II
 Gate of Flesh
 Geisha and prostitution
 Prostitution in Cambodia
 Prostitution in India
 Prostitution in Indonesia
 Prostitution in Thailand
 Prostitution in the Philippines

Notes

References

Further reading 

 Araki, Nobuyoshi. Tokyo Lucky Hole. Köln; New York: Taschen, 1997. . 768 pages. Black and white photographs of Shinjuku sex workers, clients, and businesses taken 1983–5.
 Associated Press.  "Women turn to selling sexual favors in Japan" (archived copy).  Taipei Times, 9 December 2002, p. 11.  Accessed 11 October 2006.
 Bornoff, Nicholas. Pink Samurai: Love, Marriage and Sex in Contemporary Japan.  New York: Pocket Books, 1991.  .
 Clements, Steven Langhorne.  Tokyo Pink Guide. Tokyo: Yenbooks, 1993.  .
 Constantine, Peter. Japan's Sex Trade: A Journey Through Japan's Erotic Subcultures. Tokyo: Yenbooks, 1993.  .
 De Becker, J. E. The Nightless City ... or, The "History of the Yoshiwara Yūkwaku"., 4th ed. rev. Yokohama [etc.] M. Nössler & Co.; London, Probsthain & Co., 1905. .
 De Becker, J. E. The Nightless City: Geisha and Courtesan Life in Old Tokyo (reprint). Mineola, N.Y.: Dover Publications, 2007. .
 De Mente, Boye Lafayette. Mizu Shobai: The Pleasure Girls and Flesh Pots of Japan. London: Ortolan Press, 1966.
 De Mente, Boye Lafayette. Sex and the Japanese: The Sensual Side of Japan. Rutland, Vermont: Tuttle Publishing, 2006. .
 De Mente, Boye Lafayette. Tadahito Nadamoto (illus.). Some Prefer Geisha: The Lively Art of Mistress Keeping in Japan. Rutland, Vermont: Charles E. Tuttle Co., 1966.
 Fitzpatrick, William. Tokyo After Dark.  New York: McFadden Books, 1965.
 French, Howard W. "Japan's Red Light 'Scouts' and Their Gullible Discoveries". The New York Times.  15 November 2001.  Accessed 11 October 2006.
 Goodwin, Janet R. Selling Songs and Smiles: The Sex Trade in Heian and Kamakura Japan.  Honolulu: University of Hawai’i Press, 2007. , .
 Japan The Trafficking of Women.
 Kamiyama, Masuo. "The day Japan's red lights flickered out". MSN-Mainichi Daily News. 25 February 2006.  Accessed 11 October 2006.
 Kattoulas, Velisarios. "Human Trafficking: Bright Lights, Brutal Life" (archived copy). Far East Economic Review. 3 August 2000. Accessed 11 October 2006.
 Longstreet, Stephen, and Ethel Longstreet. Yoshiwara: City of the Senses. New York: McKay, 1970.
 McMurtrie, Douglas C. Ancient Prostitution in Japan. Whitefish, Montana: Kessinger Publishing, 2005. .  Originally published in Stone, Lee Alexander (ed.).  The Story of Phallicism volume 2. Chicago: Pascal Covici, 1927.  Reprinted Whitefish, Montana: Kessinger Publishing, 2003. .
 Seigle, Cecilia Segawa. Yoshiwara: The Glittering World of ihe Japanese Courtesan. Honolulu: University of Hawaii Press, 1993. .
 The World's Oldest Debate? Prostitution and the State in Imperial Japan, 1900–1945
 Talmadge, Eric. Getting Wet: Adventures in the Japanese Bath. Tokyo ; New York: Kodansha International, 2006. .
 Yokoyama, M. "Analysis of Prostitution in Japan". International Journal of Comparative and Applied Criminal Justice, 19, no. 1 (1995): 47–60.
 Yokoyama, M. "Emergence of Anti-Prostitution Law in Japan—Analysis from Sociology of Criminal Law". International Journal of Comparative and Applied Criminal Justice, 17, no. 2 (1993): 211–218.

External links

 Coalition Against Trafficking in Women-Asia Pacific Facts and Statistics Trafficking and Prostitution in Asia and the Pacific, See under Japan category. Accessed online 27 September 2007.
 Sex Industry category, Japan Subculture Research Center—a news blog on "the hidden side of Japan".
 Fact-book on global sexual exploitation
 Global March Statistics

 
Society of Japan
Yakuza